Aslan Muratovich Dudiyev (born 15 June 1990) is a Russian professional football player. He plays as a right-back for FC Baltika Kaliningrad.

Club career
He made his Russian Premier League debut for FC Alania Vladikavkaz on 29 July 2012 in a game against FC Rubin Kazan.

Career statistics

External links
 
 

1990 births
People from Alagirsky District
Sportspeople from North Ossetia–Alania
Living people
Russian footballers
Russia youth international footballers
Russia under-21 international footballers
Association football defenders
FC Tolyatti players
FC Zenit Saint Petersburg players
FC Spartak Vladikavkaz players
FC SKA-Khabarovsk players
FC Mordovia Saransk players
FC Tom Tomsk players
FC Anzhi Makhachkala players
FC Tosno players
FC Baltika Kaliningrad players
FC Rotor Volgograd players
Russian Premier League players
Russian First League players
Russian Second League players